Warrington Wolves (named Warrington Zingari in 1876, and just Warrington from 1877 to 1996) are an English rugby league club who have had numerous notable players throughout their history.

List

Internationals

 John "Jack" Arkwright won caps for England while at St. Helens 1933 Other Nationalities, while at Warrington 1936 France, Wales, 1937 France, 1938 France, and won caps for Great Britain while at Warrington 1936 Australia (2 matches), New Zealand, 1937 Australia (3 matches)
 William "Willie" Aspinall won a cap for Great Britain while at Warrington in 1966 against New Zealand
 Allan Bateman won caps for Wales while at Warrington, Cronulla, and Bridgend Blue Bulls 1991...2003 14-caps 5(6?)-tries 20(24?)-points
 Harry Bath won caps for Other Nationalities while at Warrington 1949–55 10-caps
 William "Billy" Belshaw won caps for England while at Liverpool Stanley 1935 Wales, 1936 Wales, 1937 France, while at Warrington, 1938 France, Wales, 1939 France, Wales, 1940 Wales, 1941 Wales, 1943 Wales, 1945 Wales, and won caps for Great Britain while at Liverpool Stanley 1936 Australia (3 matches), New Zealand (2 matches), 1937 Australia, while at Warrington, 1937 Australia (2 matches)
 Nat Bentham won caps for England while at Wigan Highfield 1928 Wales (2 matches), while at Halifax, 1929 Other Nationalities, while at Warrington 1930 Other Nationalities (2 matches), and won caps for Great Britain while at Wigan Highfield 1928 Australia (3 matches), New Zealand (3 matches), while at Halifax, 1929–30 Australia (2 matches), while at Warrington, Australia (2 matches)
 Andy Bracek won caps for Wales while at Warrington 2007...present 2-caps + 1-cap (sub) 1-try 4-points
 Brian Bevan won caps for Other Nationalities while at Warrington 1949–55 16-caps
 John Bevan won caps for Wales while at Warrington 1975...1982 17-caps 5-tries 15-points (World Cup 1975 4-caps, 2-tries)
 Tom Blinkhorn won caps for England while at Warrington 1929 Other Nationalities, and won caps for Great Britain while at Warrington 1929–30 Australia
 Alfred "Alf" Boardman won caps for England while at Warrington 1905 Other Nationalities
 Lee Briers won caps for Wales while at Warrington 1996...present 19(17?)-caps 9-tries 20-goals (5-drop-goals?) 79(81?)-points
 Ernest "Ernie" Brooks won caps for England while at Warrington 1908 Wales, and won caps for Great Britain while at Warrington 1908–09 Australia (3 matches)
 Dean Busby won caps for Wales while at Warrington 2000(1996...2001?) 6(7?)-caps 1-try 4-points
 Brian Butler won caps for Wales while at Swinton in the 1975 Rugby League World Cup against France, New Zealand, and France, and while at Warrington in 1977 against France
 Brian Case won caps for England while at Warrington 1981 France, and won caps for Great Britain while at Wigan 1984 Australia, New Zealand (3 matches), 1987 Papua New Guinea, 1988 Papua New Guinea, Australia (sub)
 Jim Challinor won caps for Great Britain while at Warrington 1958...1960 3-caps (World Cup 1960 1-cap)
 William G. "Bill" Chapman won caps for Wales while at Warrington 1943...1944 2-caps
 David Chisnall won caps for England while at Warrington 1975 Wales (sub), France, Wales, New Zealand, Papua New Guinea (sub), and won caps for Great Britain while at Leigh 1970 Australia, New Zealand (World Cup 1970 1-cap)
 Neil Courtney won caps for Great Britain while at Warrington 1982
 William "Billy" Cunliffe won caps for England while at Warrington 1921 Wales, Other Nationalities, Australia, 1922 Wales, 1923 Wales (2 matches), 1925 Wales (2 matches), 1926 Wales, Other Nationalities, and won caps for Great Britain while at Warrington 1920 Australia, New Zealand (2 matches), 1921–22 Australia (3 matches), 1924 Australia (3 matches), New Zealand, 1926 New Zealand
 Tommy Cunningham won caps for Wales while at Warrington 1979 (2?)-caps
 Dennis Curling won a cap for Wales while at Warrington 1977 (sub) 1-cap
 David "Dai" Davies won caps for Wales while at Warrington 1928...1935 4-caps
 Gareth Davies won caps for Wales while at Warrington 1996 4-caps
 Jonathan Davies won caps for Wales while at Widnes, and Warrington 1991...1995(1996?) 9(11?)-caps 4-tries 29(39?)-goals (5-drop-goals?) 78(99?)-points
 Ponty Davies won a cap for Wales while at Warrington 1928 1-caps
 William "Billy" Derbyshire won caps for England while at Warrington 1947 Wales
 Melville "Mel" De Lloyd won a cap for Wales while at Warrington 1945 1-cap
 George Dickenson won caps for England while at Warrington 1904 Other Nationalities, 1908 Wales (2 matches), 1909 Australia, and won caps for Great Britain while at 1908 Australia
 Billy Dingsdale won caps for England while at Warrington 1928 Wales, 1929 Other Nationalities, 1930 Wales, Other Nationalities, 1931 Wales, 1932 Wales, 1933 Other Nationalities, and won caps for Great Britain while at Warrington 1929
 William Dowell won a cap for Wales while at Warrington 1908 1-cap
 Desmond "Des" Drummond won caps for England while at Leigh 1980 Wales, France, 1981 France, Wales, 1984 Wales, and won caps for Great Britain while at Leigh 1980 New Zealand (2 matches), 1981 France (2 matches), 1982 Australia (3 matches), 1983 France (2 matches), 1984 France, Australia (3 matches), New Zealand (3 matches), Papua New Guinea, 1985 New Zealand (3 matches), 1986 France (2 matches), while at Warrington 1987 Papua New Guinea, 1988 France
 Ronald "Ronnie" Duane won caps for Great Britain while at Warrington in 1983 against France (2 matches), and in 1984 against France
 Robert "Bob" Eccles won a cap for Great Britain while at Warrington in 1982 against Australia
 Kevin Ellis won caps for Wales while at Warrington in 1991 against Papua New Guinea, in 1992 against France, England, and France, in 1993 against New Zealand, in 1994 against France, and Australia, in 1995 against England, and France, in the 1995 Rugby League World Cup against France, Western Samoa, and England, while at Bridgend Blue Bulls in 2003 against Russia, and Australia, and in 2004 against Ireland, and won a cap for Great Britain while at Warrington in 1991 against France
 Candy Evans won caps for Wales (RU) while at Pontypool RFC in the 1924 Five Nations Championship against England, Ireland, and France, won caps for Wales (RL) while at Halifax, Leeds, Castleford in the 19–23 defeat by England at Fartown Ground, Huddersfield on 18 March 1931, and Warrington 1928...1933 4-caps, and represented Glamorgan County RLFC while at Castleford in the 19–12 victory over Cumberland and at Recreation Ground, Whitehaven on 21 March 1931, and 12–33 defeat by Yorkshire at Thrum Hall, Halifax on 15 April 1931
 James "Jim" Featherstone won caps for England while at Warrington 1948 France, 1949 Wales, France (2 matches), Other Nationalities, 1950 Wales (2 matches), 1952 Wales, and won caps for Great Britain while at Warrington 1948 Australia, 1950 New Zealand (2 matches), 1952 Australia (3 matches)
 Jack Fish won caps for England while at Warrington 1904 Other Nationalities, 1906 Other Nationalities, 1908 Wales
 Idwal Fisher won a cap for Wales while at Warrington 1963 1-cap
 John "Jackie" Fleming won caps for England while at Warrington 1948 France (2 matches), Wales, 1949 Wales, France, while at Widnes 1951 France
 Philip "Phil" Ford won caps for Wales while at Warrington, Leeds, and Salford 1984 to 1995 1984(1991?)...1995 9(10?)-caps + 1-cap (sub) 4-tries 16-points
 Tommy Flynn won a cap for Wales while at Warrington 1931 1-cap
 Eric Fraser won caps for Great Britain while at Warrington 1958 Australia (3 matches), New Zealand (2 matches), 1959 France (2 matches), Australia, 1960 France (2 matches), New Zealand, France (2 matches), 1961 France, New Zealand (2 matches) (World Cup 1960 2-caps, 10-goals)
 Laurence "Laurie" Gilfedder won caps for Great Britain while at Warrington in 1962 against Australia, New Zealand (2 matches), and France, and in 1963 against France
 Mark Gleeson won caps for England while at Warrington 2005 France (sub)
 Parry Gordon won caps for England while at Warrington 1975 Papua New Guinea (sub)
 Francis Gregory won caps for England while at Warrington 1939 Wales
 Mike Gregory won caps for Great Britain while at Warrington 1987...90 20-caps
 Robert "Bobby" Greenhough won caps for Great Britain while at Warrington 1960 New Zealand (World Cup 1960 1-cap)
 Iestyn Harris won caps for Wales while at Warrington, Leeds Rhinos, and Bradford Bulls 1994...present 19-caps 8-tries 60-goals 142-points, and won caps for Great Britain while at Warrington, while at Leeds, while at Bradford 1996...2004 12-caps won caps for Wales (RU) while at Cardiff Blues (RU) 2001...04 ?-caps
 Gerry Helme won caps for England while at Warrington 1948 Wales, France, 1949 Wales, France, 1953 France, and won caps for Great Britain while at Warrington 1948 Australia (3 matches), 1954 Australia (3 matches), New Zealand (2 matches), 1954 France (2 matches), Australia, New Zealand (World Cup 1954 4-caps, 2-tries)
 Mark Hilton won caps for England while at Warrington 1995 France (sub), 1999 France (sub)
 Thomas "Tom" Hockenhull won caps for England while at Warrington 1906 Other Nationalities
 Keith Holden won a cap for Great Britain while at Warrington in 1963 against Australia
 E. John "Jack" Jenkins won caps for Wales while at Warrington in 1909 against England
 Albert Johnson won caps for England while at Warrington 1944 Wales, 1945 Wales (2 matches), 1946 France (2 matches), Wales (2 matches), 1947 France (2 matches), Wales, and won caps for Great Britain while at Warrington 1946 Australia (2 matches), New Zealand, 1947 New Zealand (3 matches)
 Mark Jones won caps for Wales (RU) while at Neath in 1987 against Scotland, and, in 1988 against New Zealand (sub), in 1989 against Scotland, and, Ireland, and, France, England, and New Zealand, in 1990 against France, England, Scotland, and, Ireland, and Namibia (2 matches), and while at Pontypool in 1998 against Zimbabwe, won caps for Wales (RL) while at Hull in 1991 against Papua New Guinea, in 1992 against France, England, and France, in 1993 against New Zealand, in 1994 against France, and while at Warrington in the 1995 Rugby League World Cup against France (sub), and England (sub), in 1996 against France, and England, and won a cap for Great Britain (RL) while at Hull in 1992 against France (sub)
 Kenneth "Ken" Kelly won caps for England while at Warrington 1979 Wales, 1981 France, Wales, and won caps for Great Britain while at St. Helens 1972 France (2 matches), while at Warrington 1980 New Zealand, 1982 Australia
 William "Billy" Kirk won caps for England while at Warrington 1930 Other Nationalities
 Roy Lambert won caps for Wales while at Neath, Dewsbury, and Warrington 1950...1952 7-caps
 Jason Lee won caps for Wales while at Warrington Wolves, Keighley Cougars, and Halifax 1994...2001 5-caps + 2-caps (sub) 2-tries 8-points
 Thomas "Tommy" Martyn won caps for England while at Warrington 1975 Wales, France, Wales (sub), 1979 Wales, France
 Tom McKinney for Other Nationalities 7-caps won caps for British Empire XIII while at Salford 1952 New Zealand won caps for Rugby League XIII while at Salford 1954 France, and won caps for Great Britain while at Salford 1951 New Zealand, 1952 France (non-test), Australia (2 matches), 1953 France (non-test), 1954 France (non-test), Australia (3 matches), New Zealand, while at Warrington 1955 New Zealand (2 matches), France (non-test), New Zealand, 1956 France (non-test), while at St. Helens 1957 New Zealand (World Cup 1957 1-cap)
 Jesse Meredith won a cap for Wales while at Warrington 1930 1-cap
 Joseph "Joe" "Jack" 'Cod' Miller won caps for England while at Warrington 1928 Wales, 1933 Other Nationalities, 1936 France, Wales, and won caps for Great Britain while at Warrington 1933 Australia (3 matches), 1936 Australia, New Zealand (2 matches)
 Adrian Morley won caps for England while at Leeds 1996 France (sub), 2000 Australia, Ireland, and won caps for Great Britain while at Leeds 1996 New Zealand (sub) (2 matches), 1997 ASL (2 matches), ASL (sub), 1999 Australia, New Zealand, 2002 Sydney New Zealand (2 matches), 2003 Australia (3 matches), 2004 Australia (3 matches), New Zealand (2 matches), 2005 Australia (2 matches), New Zealand, New Zealand (sub), 2006 New Zealand (3 matches), Australia (sub) (2 matches), while at Warrington 2007 France, New Zealand (3 matches)
 Alex Murphy (Warrington Testimonial match 1976) won caps for England while at Leigh 1969 Wales, France, and won caps for Great Britain while at St. Helens 1958 Australia (3 matches), New Zealand, 1959 France (2 matches), Australia, 1960 New Zealand, France, Australia, France, 1961 France, New Zealand (3 matches), 1962 France, Australia (3 matches), 1963 Australia (2 matches), 1964 France, 1965 France, New Zealand, 1966 France (2 matches), while at Warrington 1971 New Zealand (World Cup 1960 3-caps, 1-try)
 Albert Naughton won caps for England while at Warrington 1953 France (2 matches), 1956 France, and won caps for Great Britain while at Warrington 1954 France (2 matches) (World Cup 1954 2-caps)
 Michael "Mike" Nicholas won caps for Wales while at Warrington 1975...1979 4(6?)-caps + 2-caps (sub) (World Cup 1975 Squad 0-caps)
 Derek Noonan won caps for England while at Warrington 1975 Wales, France, Wales (World Cup 1975 Squad 2-caps)
 Terry O'Grady won caps for England while at Oldham 1952 Wales, 1955 Other Nationalities, and won caps for Great Britain while at Oldham 1954 Australia (2 matches), New Zealand (3 matches), while at Warrington 1961 New Zealand
 Billy O'Neill won caps for Wales while at Warrington in 1908 against England, and in 1909 against England
 Harold Palin won caps for England while at Warrington 1947 Wales, 1948 France, and won caps for Great Britain while at Warrington 1947 New Zealand (2 matches)
 Kenneth "Ken" Parr won caps for England while at Warrington 1968 Wales, and won caps for Great Britain while at Warrington 1968 France
 Alfred "Alf" Peacock won caps for England while at Warrington 1925 Wales
 Ossie Peake won caps for England while at Warrington 1939 Wales, 1940 Wales, 1941 Wales
 Barry Philbin won caps for England while at Warrington 1975 France
 Rowland Phillips won caps for Wales while at Warrington, and, Workington Town 1991...1996(1998?) 7(15, 14?)-caps + 10-caps (sub) 2-tries 8-points
 Albert Pimblett won caps for England while at Warrington 1948 Wales, 1949 France, and won caps for Great Britain while at Warrington 1948 Australia (3 matches)
 Ian Potter won caps for England while at Warrington 1981 France, Wales, and won caps for Great Britain while at Wigan 1985 New Zealand (3 matches), 1986 France (2 matches), Australia (2 matches), Australia (sub)
 Stanley "Stan" Powell won caps for Wales while at St. Helens against England at Central Park, Wigan during March 1945, and while at Warrington in 1947
 John "Jack" Preston won caps for England while at Warrington 1905 Other Nationalities
 Raymond "Ray" Price won caps for Great Britain while at Warrington 1954...57 9-caps (World Cup 1957 Squad 0-caps)
 Stephen "Steve" Ray won caps for Wales while at Wakefield Trinity, and Warrington 1930...1932 2-caps
 Jon Roper won caps for England while at Warrington 1999 France
 Robert "Bob" Ryan won caps for England while at Warrington 1950 France, 1952 Other Nationalities, and won caps for Great Britain while at Warrington 1950 Australia, New Zealand (2 matches), 1951 New Zealand, 1952 Australia
 Ronald "Ron" Ryder won caps for England while at Warrington 1952 Other Nationalities, and won caps for Great Britain while at Warrington 1952 Australia
 Paul Sculthorpe won caps for England while at Warrington 1996 France, Wales, while at St. Helens 2000 New Zealand, 2001 Wales, and won caps for Great Britain while at Warrington 1996 Papua New Guinea (sub), Fiji, New Zealand (3 matches), 1997 ASL (3 matches), while at St. Helens 1998 New Zealand (3 matches), 1999 Australia (sub), 2001 Australia (3 matches), 2002 Australia, New Zealand (2 matches), 2003 Australia (3 matches), 2004 Australia (3 matches), New Zealand, 2006 New Zealand
 Frank Shugars won five caps for Wales while at Warrington between 1909, and 1912, all of them against England, and won caps for Great Britain while at Warrington in 1910 against Australasia, and New Zealand
 Arthur Skelhorne won caps for England while at Warrington 1921 Australia, 1922 Wales, 1923 Wales, and won caps for Great Britain while at Warrington 1920 Australia, New Zealand (3 matches), 1921–22 Australia (3 matches)
 David Stephenson won caps for Great Britain while at Warrington in 1982 against Australia (2 matches), in 1986 against Australia, in 1987 against France, and Papua New Guinea, and in 1988 against France, Papua New Guinea, Australia (2 matches), and New Zealand.
 George Thomas won a cap for Wales while at Warrington in 1908 against New Zealand, and won a cap for Great Britain while at Warrington in 1908 against New Zealand
 Thomas "Tommy" 'Tubby' Thompson won caps for England while at Warrington 1933 Australia
 James "Jim" Tranter won caps for England while at Warrington 1922 Wales, 1923 Wales
 Robert "Bobby" Wanbon won a cap for Wales (RU) while at Aberavon in 1968 against England on 20 January 1968, scoring a try, and won caps for Wales (RL) while at Warrington in the 1975 Rugby League World Cup against England, Australia, and New Zealand (World Cup 1975 3-caps)
 Ben Westwood won caps for England while at Warrington 2004 Russia, France, Ireland, and, 2005 New Zealand
 Derek Whitehead won caps for Great Britain while at Warrington in 1971 against France (2 matches), and New Zealand
 Frank Williams won caps for England while at Warrington 1930 Other Nationalities
 Rhys Williams won a cap for Wales while at Warrington 2008 1-cap
 Charlie Winslade won caps for Wales while at Oldham, and Warrington 1952...1963 6-caps, and won a cap for Great Britain while at Oldham in 1959 against France
 Paul Wood won caps for England while at Warrington 2005 France, New Zealand
 John Woods won caps for England while at Leigh 1979 Wales (sub), France, 1980 Wales (sub), France, 1981 France (sub), Wales, Wales (sub), and won caps for Great Britain while at Leigh 1979 Australia (3 matches), New Zealand (sub), 1980 New Zealand, 1981 France (2 matches), 1982 Australia, Australia (sub), 1983 France (sub), while at Warrington 1987 Papua New Guinea (sub)

References

External links
Warrington Rugby League RLFC players archive search
Statistics (to 2007) at wolvesplayers.thisiswarrington.co.uk
Warrington Wolves Heritage Numbers
Warrington Rugby Heritage

 
Warrington Wolves